Djibouti is divided into five administrative regions and one city. The regions are divided into twenty administrative districts.

Districts

Adailou District
Ali Adde District
Ali Sabieh District
Arta District
As Eyla District
Balho District
Dadda'to District
Dikhil District
Djibouti District
Dorra District
Galafi District
Holhol District
Khor Angar District
Lake Asal District
Moulhoule District
Mousa Ali District
Obock District
Randa District
Tadjoura District
Yoboki District

 
Subdivisions of Djibouti
Djibouti, Districts
Djibouti 2
Djibouti geography-related lists